Jason Alan Behrstock is a mathematician at City University of New York known for his work in geometric group theory and low-dimensional topology.

Life and career
Behrstock was born in California and was educated in California's public school system. He received his Ph.D. from State University of New York at Stony Brook in 2004. He went to work at Columbia University and the University of Utah before his time at Lehman College, City University of New York.

Awards and honors
In 2009, Behrstock was award the Feliks Gross Endowment Award by the CUNY Graduate Center, a research award for young faculty.
In 2010, Behrstock was awarded the Alfred P. Sloan Fellowship.
In 2012, Behrstock became a fellow of the American Mathematical Society.
Behrstock became a Simons Fellow in 2014.

Selected publications
Behrstock, Jason A. "Asymptotic geometry of the mapping class group and Teichmüller space". Geom. Topol. 10 (2006), 1523–1578.
Behrstock, Jason; Druţu, Cornelia; Mosher, Lee. "Thick metric spaces, relative hyperbolicity, and quasi-isometric rigidity". Math. Ann. 344 (2009), no. 3, 543–595.
Behrstock, Jason A.; Minsky, Yair N. "Dimension and rank for mapping class groups". Ann. of Math. (2) 167 (2008), no. 3, 1055–1077.

References

Living people
20th-century American mathematicians
21st-century American mathematicians
Fellows of the American Mathematical Society
Stony Brook University alumni
Columbia University faculty
University of Utah faculty
Lehman College faculty
Graduate Center, CUNY faculty
City University of New York faculty
Sloan Research Fellows
Mathematicians from California
Year of birth missing (living people)